Professor Asher Tishler (אשר טישלר; born 1947) is an Israeli economist and former president of the College of Management Academic Studies.

Biography

Academic career
Tishler received his B.A. in Economics and Statistics (magna cum laude) from the Hebrew University of Jerusalem in 1972, and his Ph.D. in Economics from the University of Pennsylvania in 1976.

In 1976 he joined Tel Aviv University's faculty of management as a  post-doctoral fellow, where he continued to pursue a career as researcher and lecturer culminating at the position of dean of the faculty in 2007-2014.

Tishler also served as the director of the Eli Hurvitz Institute of Strategic Management, director of the Institute of Technology and Society, academic director of the Executive MBA program and the Kellogg-Recanati International Executive MBA program, academic director of Lahav Executive Education and the director of the Israel Institute of Business Research.

Tishler served as a visiting professor at the University of Pennsylvania, University of Southern California and University of Iowa.

In 2014 Tishler was appointed president of the College of Management Academic Studies, Israel's oldest and largest college, a post he held until mid 2017.

Public and Business Positions
Tishler is a consultant with the Israeli Ministry of Defense, where in 2012 he headed the Tishler Committee, a special committee appointed by the Minister of Defense to examine the Israeli defense budget and its management.

He has also been consulting to the Israel Defense Forces, the Israel Electric Corporation, the Israeli Ministry of National Infrastructures, Ministry of Finance and firms in Israel, USA and Hong Kong.

Tishler was and is a board member and chairman in academic and financial organizations and a member of various investment committees.

Selected published works 

Tishler's main research interests are applied microeconomics, models of research and development, energy economics, and defense-related issues. His work has been published in the Journal of Econometrics, Research Policy, The Energy Journal, Defence and Peace Economics, The Review of Economics and Statistics, Management Science, the European Economic Review, Energy Policy, Operations Research, and other journals.

His recent works includes:

References

External links
Personal website
College of Management (Hebrew)

Israeli economists
1947 births
Living people
Presidents of universities in Israel